Allen Dowling Nease (February 1, 1914 – September 1984) was a pioneer of Florida’s reforestation and conservation efforts in the mid-20th century.

Early career
Nease was born Allen Dowling, but was adopted when he was ten and kept his birth name as his middle name.

Career in education
In 1971, Nease was elected to the St. Johns County School Board, where he served as Chairman for 17 years and became the School Board’s driving force for 24 years. While on the School Board,  Nease won the battle to build and develop what is now known as the First Coast Technical Institute.  For these achievements, the high school, Allen D. Nease Senior High School, was named after him.

References

External links
 Land Acquisition & Management Program: Major Projects, Nease Beachfront Park

American conservationists
People from St. Augustine, Florida
1984 deaths
1914 births